Theodore Gary Carlstan Vassell (born 2 January 1997) is an English professional footballer who plays as a defender for  club Salford City.

He joined Oldham Athletic after leaving the Academy at Stoke City in 2015, and had a youth loan with Chorley early the following year. He signed with Walsall in July 2016, and spent the 2016–17 season on loan at Chester. He joined Gateshead in July 2017, before returning to the English Football League with Port Vale in July 2018. He moved on to Macclesfield Town in July 2019 and dropped back into the National League to join Wrexham for the 2020–21 season. He signed a short-term deal with Salford City in November 2021.

Career

Early career
Vassell grew up in Stoke-on-Trent and played Ladsandads football for Hanley Town, before joining the Academy at Stoke City at the age of nine. Originally a forward, he later became a defender and was given a two-year scholarship contract in 2013. He had a trial at Oldham Athletic in October 2015 and was given a one-year contract with the option of a second. Upon joining the "Latics", manager David Dunn said that "he is really athletic, only 18 and definitely one for the future". On 26 February 2016, he joined National League North side Chorley on a one-month youth loan. He left Boundary Park after being released by new manager John Sheridan in May 2016.

On 8 July 2016, he signed a one-year contract with Walsall, with the option for a second. He had worked with youth-team coach Dean Holden at previous club Oldham. Upon signing him at Walsall, manager Jon Whitney said that "he’s quite old school. He just wanted to defend first and foremost, and then work on the technical side. He’s one for the future". Four days later he joined National League side Chester on loan until January 2017, alongside "Saddlers" teammate Liam Roberts. He made his first-team debut on 6 August, during a 3–0 defeat to Gateshead at the Gateshead International Stadium. On 16 August, he scored his first goal in senior football during a 3–2 defeat at Barrow. He missed two months of action after suffering an injury at Macclesfield Town in October. He helped the "Blues" to keep 10 clean sheets during his first 16 league appearances of the 2016–17 season and manager Jon McCarthy was keen to extend the loan deal further, which he managed to do after short time back at Walsall in January. He played a total of 32 games as the "Seals" posted a 19th-place finish in the National League, but was told by Whitney that he would not be retained upon his return to the Bescot Stadium in May 2017.

He signed a one-year deal with Gateshead in July 2017 after impressing on a trial basis. On 23 September, he was sent off ten minutes into a 2–2 draw at Maidstone United following a foul on winger Zavon Hines. The "Heed" unsuccessfully appealed the decision, and manager Neil Aspin said that the decision to reject the appeal was "extremely disappointing" as "I’ve been in football 36 years and that is one of the worst red cards I’ve ever seen". Vassell went on to make 41 appearances for the "Tynesiders", scoring three goals, as the club posted a 17th-place finish under the stewardship of Steve Watson.

Port Vale
On 28 June 2018, Vassell won a move to the English Football League when he signed a one-year professional contract with EFL League Two side Port Vale, who were managed by his former Gateshead manager Neil Aspin. He made his debut in the EFL Cup on 14 August, in a 4–0 defeat to Lincoln City at Vale Park, though he entered the game as an 85th-minute substitute for Cristian Montaño with the "Valiants" already four goals down. He had to wait until the opening EFL Trophy group stage game of the campaign on 9 October for his next appearance, though he featured from the start in the 1–0 victory over EFL League One opponents Burton Albion and Aspin said after the game that his performance gave him cause to consider him for league fixtures. He enjoyed a run of games at left wing-back in the absence of Montaño, and was praised for his performances by captain Tom Pope. However new Vale manager John Askey confirmed that he would not be offering Vassell a new contract on 16 May.

Macclesfield Town
On 18 July 2019, Vassell joined League Two club Macclesfield Town on a one-year deal. On 1 February 2020, it was announced that he was one of three players to have left Macclesfield during the January 2020 transfer window, following a meeting with the English Football League. He followed former Macclesfield manager Sol Campbell to sign a contract with Southend United, but the deal was unable to be completed after Southend were hit with a transfer embargo.

Wrexham
On 27 August 2020, Vassell signed for National League club Wrexham on a one-year deal. Manager Dean Keates said that Vassell would learn a lot playing next to club captain Shaun Pearson in defence. Vassell played 32 games in the 2020–21 campaign, scoring four goals, and was released upon the expiry of his contract.

Salford City
On 12 November 2021, Vassell signed a short-term deal with League Two side Salford City after having trained with the club for several months and recovering from tendonitis. He made his debut for the club on 20 November as a last minute substitute in a 2–0 win at Harrogate Town. He made 24 starts and three substitute appearances under Gary Bowyer in the 2021–22 campaign. In May 2022, Vassell signed a new two-year contract, saying he felt settled at the club.

Style of play
A defender, Vassell plays primarily as a centre-back, but can also play as a full-back.

Career statistics

References

1997 births
Living people
Footballers from Stoke-on-Trent
English footballers
Association football defenders
Hanley Town F.C. players
Stoke City F.C. players
Oldham Athletic A.F.C. players
Chorley F.C. players
Walsall F.C. players
Chester F.C. players
Gateshead F.C. players
Port Vale F.C. players
Macclesfield Town F.C. players
Wrexham A.F.C. players
Salford City F.C. players
National League (English football) players
English Football League players